The 1931 All-Ireland Minor Hurling Championship was the fourth staging of the All-Ireland Minor Hurling Championship since its establishment by the Gaelic Athletic Association in 1928.

Tipperary entered the championship as the defending champions, however, they were beaten by Kilkenny in the All-Ireland semi-final.

On 27 September 1931 Kilkenny won the championship following a 4-7 to 2-3 defeat of Galway in the All-Ireland final. This was their first All-Ireland title.

Results

All-Ireland Minor Hurling Championship

Semi-finals

Final

Championship statistics

Miscellaneous

 The Connacht Championship is contested for the first time.
 Antrim win the Ulster title for the first time in their history.

External links
 All-Ireland Minor Hurling Championship: Roll Of Honour

Minor
All-Ireland Minor Hurling Championship